An Ni (born March 25, 1991 in Changchun, China) is a Chinese pair skater. With former partner Wu Yiming, she is the 2006 Chinese national silver medalist and 2005 bronze medalist. Before teaming up with Wu, she competed with Tao Wei.

References

External links
 Tracings.net profile

Chinese female pair skaters
1991 births
Living people
Figure skaters from Changchun